The 1934 United States Senate special election in Vermont took place on January 16, 1934. Republican Ernest W. Gibson, Sr. was elected to the United States Senate to serve the remainder of the deceased Porter H. Dale's term, defeating Democratic candidate Harry W. Witters.

General election

Candidates
Ernest Willard Gibson, former U.S. Representative from VT-AL
Harry W. Witters, lawyer

Results

References

Vermont 1934
Vermont, special
1934, special
1934 Vermont elections
Vermont
United States Senate 1934